Offenbacher Kickers, also known as Kickers Offenbach, is a German association football club in Offenbach am Main, Hesse. The club was founded on 27 May 1901 in the Rheinischer Hof restaurant by footballers who had left established local clubs including Melitia, Teutonia, Viktoria, Germania and Neptun. From 1921 to 1925 they were united with VfB 1900 Offenbach as VfR Kickers Offenbach until resuming their status as a separate side, Offenbacher FC Kickers. Since 2012, Kickers Offenbach's stadium has been the Sparda Bank Hessen Stadium.

History
The club became one of the founding members of the Nordkreis-Liga in 1909, where it played until the outbreak of the war. In post-First World War Germany, Kickers played in the Kreisliga Südmain (I), winning this league in 1920, 1922 and 1923.

The club played as a mid-table side in the Bezirksliga Main-Hessen through the late 1920s and early 1930s. German football was re-organized in 1933 under the Third Reich into sixteen first division Gauligen. Kickers joined the Gauliga Südwest, where the team immediately captured the title and entered the national playoffs for the first time. They fared poorly there, but did manage to raise their overall level of play in the following seasons, going on to win five consecutive divisional championships from 1940 to 1944.

In the early 1940s, the Gauliga Südwest had been split into the Gauliga Westmark and the Gauliga Hessen-Nassau, where Kickers played. Their best post-season result came in 1942 when the team was able to advance as far as the semi-finals in the national championship rounds before they were decisively put out 0:6 by Schalke 04, who were on their way to their sixth championship as the era's most dominant side. By 1944, Allied armies were rolling through Germany and the Gauliga Hessen-Nassau did not play the 1944–45 season. In their 1953 Asian Tour, they played twelve matches.

Entry to the Bundesliga and scandal
The club found itself in the new Regionalliga Süd (II) and play in the Bundesliga would have to wait until 1968. The team was immediately relegated, but returned to the upper league for play in 1970–71. In addition to their return to the Bundesliga, the club would win one of its few honours in 1970 with a 2:1 German Cup victory over 1. FC Köln.

However, the end of the 1971 season would find Kickers Offenbach at the centre of the Bundesliga scandal. The club president, Horst-Gregorio Canellas, went to the German Football Association (Deutsche Fussball Bund or German Football Association) after being approached by a player from another team looking for a cash bonus for that club's effort in beating one of Offenbachs rivals in the fight against relegation. Receiving no help from league officials, Canellas began gathering evidence of how widespread the payoffs were. In the end more than fifty players from seven clubs, two coaches, and six game officials were found guilty of trying to influence the outcome of games through bribes, but Canellas was unable to save his club from relegation. The club central to the scandal – Arminia Bielefeld – would not be punished until the following season, too late to save Offenbach.

The scandal had a negative effect on the young league and contributed to plummeting attendance figures. One outcome of the whole affair was the further evolution of German football; salary restrictions were removed and the 2. Bundesliga also became a professional league. Kickers immediately returned to the top level. The best finish was 7th in the 1972–73 season. They were leaders for 5 rounds and beat Bayern Munich 6–0 in the 1974–75 season but were relegated to the second level in the 1975–76 season.

Decline and recovery
Kickers spent the next seven years in the 2. Bundesliga before making a return to the Bundesliga for just a single season in 1983–84. In 1985, financial problems led to the club being penalized points and driven into the third division amateur Oberliga Hessen. They recovered, only to be denied a licence in 1989, and were sent back down again. By the mid-1990s they again slipped into the Oberliga Hessen (IV). They appeared in the final of the national amateur championship in 1994 where they lost 1–0 to Preußen Münster. Offenbach returned the 2. Bundesliga in 1999 and were immediately relegated after a 17th-place finish. In each of these seasons the team took part in the national amateur championship, winning the title in 1999.

The club next appeared in the 2. Bundesliga in 2005. After two lower table finishes, Kickers were relegated to the 3. Liga on the final day of the 2007–08 season following a 3–0 defeat to fellow strugglers VfL Osnabrück.

On 18 July 2012, the club's new ground, the Sparda Bank Hessen Stadium, was opened with a pre-season friendly against Bayer Leverkusen. The club was refused a 3. Liga licence at the end of the 2012–13 season and was relegated to the Regionalliga, with SV Darmstadt 98 taking its place. The club, €9 million in debt, could have faced insolvency and a restart at the lowest level of the German football league system.

The club won the Regionalliga Südwest in 2014–15 and earned the right to take part in the promotion round to the 3. Liga, where they missed out on promotion to Magdeburg. The loss was overshadowed by approximately 40 Offenbach supporters storming the field in the 84th minute and forcing a twenty-minute interruption to the return leg.

Recent seasons
The recent season-by-season performance of the team:Fussball.de – Ergebnisse   Tables and results of all German football leagues

Kickers Offenbach

Kickers Offenbach II

 With the introduction of the Regionalligas in 1994 and the 3. Liga in 2008 as the new third tier, below the 2. Bundesliga, all leagues below dropped one tier. Also in 2008, the majority of football leagues in Hesse were renamed, with the Oberliga Hessen becoming the Hessenliga, the Landesliga becoming the Verbandsliga, the Bezirksoberliga becoming the Gruppenliga and the Bezirksliga becoming the Kreisoberliga.

Current squad

Coaches
The managers of the club:

Source: Book "Kickers Offenbach – die ersten hundert jahre" ("Kickers Offenbach – the first hundred years")

Notable players
Past (and present) players who are the subjects of Wikipedia articles can be found here.

Honours
The club's honours:

League
 German football championship Runners-up: 1950, 1959
 Regionalliga Süd (II)
 Winners: 1967, 1970, 1972
 Runners-up: 1966, 1968
 2. Bundesliga Süd (II)
 Runners-up: 1981
 Regionalliga Süd (III)
 Winners: 2005
 Runners-up: 1998, 1999
 Regionalliga Südwest (IV)
 Champions: 2015
 Oberliga Hessen (III-IV)
 Winners: 1986, 1987, 1993
 Runners-up: 1994, 1997

Cup
 DFB-Pokal Winners: 1970

Reserve team
 Landesliga Hessen-Süd (IV-V)
 Winners: 1984, 1999, 2008
 Runners-up: 1979, 1983
 Landesliga Hessen-Mitte Winners: 1971

Regional
 Kreisliga Südmain Winners: 1920, 1922, 1923
 Gauliga Südwest/Mainhessen Winners: 1934, 1940, 1941
 Gauliga Hessen-Nassau Winners: 1942, 1943, 1944
 Oberliga Süd Winners: 1949, 1955
 Runners-up: 1957, 1959, 1960
 Hesse Cup (Tiers III-VII)
 Winners: (12) 1949, 1993, 2002, 2003, 2004, 2005, 2009, 2010, 2012, 2014, 2016, 2022
 Runners-up: 1950

Youth
 German Under 19 championship Runners-up: 1973
 German Under 17 championship Runners-up''': 1985

Kickers Offenbach IIKickers'' second team played in the Amateurliga Hessen (III) from 1971–74 until being disbanded after the 1973–74 season. The reconstituted side reappeared in the Amateuroberliga Hessen (III) in 1984, but were sent down after the relegation of the senior side from the 2. Bundesliga. The amateur's next appearance of note was in the Oberliga Hessen (IV) in 1999 in a campaign that ended in relegation after a 15th-place finish. In 2008–09, it returned to the Hessenliga and finished in fourth place. After six seasons in the league the team finished 18th in the Hessenliga in 2014 and was relegated to the Verbandsliga.

Recent managers
Recent managers of the team:

References

External links
 Official website 
 The Abseits Guide to German Soccer
 Kickers Offenbach at Weltfussball.de 

 
Association football clubs established in 1901
Football clubs in Germany
Football clubs in Hesse
Bundesliga clubs
Sport in Offenbach am Main
1901 establishments in Germany
2. Bundesliga clubs
3. Liga clubs